{{Infobox Pro hockey team
| current     = 2022–23 AHL season
| bg_color    = background:#FFFFFF; border-top:#14602d 5px solid; border-bottom:#1b1717 5px solid;
| text_color  = #1b1717
| logo        = Texas Stars logo.svg
| logosize    = 240px
| city        = Cedar Park, Texas
| league      = American Hockey League
| conference  = Western
| division    = Central
| founded     = 1999
| operated    = 2009–present
| owner       = Tom Gaglardi
| coach       = Neil Graham
| captain     = Curtis McKenzie
| media       = KBVO (TV) (channel 14)AHL.TV (Internet)
| GM          = Scott White
| arena       = H-E-B Center at Cedar Park
| colors      = Victory green, silver, black, white   
| affiliates  = Dallas Stars (NHL)Idaho Steelheads (ECHL)

| name1       = Louisville Panthers
|dates1=1999–2001
|name2=Iowa Stars|dates2=2005–2008
|name3=Iowa Chops|dates3=2008–2009
|name4=Texas Stars |dates4=2009–present

|reg_season_titles = 1 (2013–14)
|division_titles = 2 (2012–13, 2013–14)
|conf_titles = 3 (2010, 2014, 2018)
|calder_cups = 1 (2014)
}}

The Texas Stars are a professional ice hockey team in the American Hockey League (AHL) based in Cedar Park, Texas, near Austin,  with home games at the H-E-B Center. They are owned by the National Hockey League's (NHL) Dallas Stars and are the team's top developmental affiliate.

History
In April 2008, the Iowa Stars announced that they would no longer affiliate with the Dallas Stars and changed the team's name to Chops for the 2008–09 season. For the 2008–09 season, Dallas made agreements to send their AHL prospects to four other teams, while a few remained with the Chops. AHL teams that received Dallas Stars prospects were the Hamilton Bulldogs, Manitoba Moose, Peoria Rivermen, and Grand Rapids Griffins.

On April 28, 2009, the AHL granted a provisional Austin-area franchise to Tom Hicks, owner of the NHL Stars, with the stipulation that Hicks purchase an existing AHL franchise within one year.  That condition was met on May 4, 2010, when the AHL approved the Texas Stars' ownership group's purchase of the Iowa Chops franchise, which had been suspended for the 2009–10 season.

The team's inaugural season was a successful one. After finishing second in the West Division, the Stars swept Rockford in the first round of the playoffs, then claimed their first division championship by defeating Chicago four games to three. The Stars then won their first Robert W. Clarke Trophy by defeating Hamilton in another seven-game series to become the Western Conference champions. The Stars eventually fell to Hershey in game six of the 2010 Calder Cup Finals.

The Stars won the Calder Cup in 2014, defeating the St. John's IceCaps in the finals. After the season, head coach Willie Desjardins resigned to accept the head coaching position with the Vancouver Canucks. In July 2014 he was succeeded by Derek Laxdal, who won a Kelly Cup championship with the Stars' ECHL affiliate, the Idaho Steelheads, in 2007.  Also during 2014, the Stars were purchased by Tom Gaglardi's ownership group, thus having the AHL affiliate under control of the parent club.

On June 11, 2015, the Stars unveiled their new logo, color scheme, and jerseys to more closely match the parent club's identity.

In 2018, the Stars once again made it to the Calder Cup finals, but lost to the Toronto Marlies in seven games. During the 2019-20 season, head coach Laxdal was promoted to the Dallas Stars as an assistant and the Texas Stars promoted Neil Graham to head coaching position.

Season-by-season results

Players

Current roster
Updated March 6, 2023.

|}

Team captains

Landon Wilson, 2009–2010
Brad Lukowich, 2010–2012
Maxime Fortunus, 2012–2015
Travis Morin, 2015–2017
Curtis McKenzie, 2017–2018
Justin Dowling, 2018–2019
Dillon Heatherington, 2019–2020
Cole Schneider, 2021
Curtis McKenzie, 2021–present

Retired numbers

Head coaches

 Glen Gulutzan, 2009–2011
 Jeff Pyle, 2011–2012
 Willie Desjardins, 2012–2014
 Derek Laxdal, 2014–2019
Neil Graham, 2019–present

Team records
Single seasonGoals: Matt Fraser, 37 (2011–12)Assists: Travis Morin, 56 (2013–14)Points: Travis Morin, 88 (2013–14)Penalty Minutes: Luke Gazdic, 155 (2009–10)GAA: Richard Bachman, 2.20 (2010–11)SV%: Richard Bachman, .927 (2010–11)Wins: Richard Bachman, 28 (2010–11)Shutouts: Richard Bachman, 6 (2010–11)

Goaltending records need a minimum 25 games played by the goaltender

CareerCareer goals: Travis Morin, 175Career assists: Travis Morin, 385Career points: Travis Morin, 560Career penalty minutes: Luke Gazdic, 447Career goaltending wins: Jack Campbell, 66Career shutouts: Richard Bachman, Jack Campbell, 9Career games:''' Travis Morin, 686

References

External links

Cedar Park Center website
American Hockey League

 
Dallas Stars minor league affiliates
Ice hockey teams in Texas
Sports in Austin, Texas
Ice hockey clubs established in 2009
Cedar Park, Texas
2009 establishments in Texas